"Enkeli" is a song by Finnish rapper Tuomas Kauhanen featuring Väinöväinö. The song peaked at number two on the Finnish Singles Chart.

Chart performance

References

Finnish songs
2013 singles
Warner Music Group singles
2013 songs